Didier Andrés Moreno Asprilla (born 15 September 1991) is a Colombian footballer who plays for Atlético Junior as a defensive midfielder.

Club career
Moreno was born in Bajo Baudó, Chocó Department, but moved to Bogotá at early age. He started his career with América de Cali, graduating from the club's youth setup and making his debut with the first-team during the 2010 season.

In 2011, Moreno moved to fellow Categoría Primera A side Independiente Santa Fe, but only featured rarely for the club during his spell at the club. On 30 July 2013, he joined Atlético Huila still in the top tier. He immediately became a regular starter, and scored his first professional goal on 19 August in a 2–1 loss at Patriotas Boyacá.

On 30 December 2014, Moreno agreed to a contract with Independiente Medellín. An immediate first-choice, he won the 2016 Torneo Apertura with the club.

On 16 August 2018, Moreno moved abroad for the first time in his career, after signing a one-year loan deal with Spanish Segunda División club Deportivo de La Coruña.

Honours
Santa Fe
Categoría Primera A: 2012 Apertura
Superliga Colombiana: 2013

Independiente Medellín
Categoría Primera A: 2016 Apertura

References

External links

1991 births
Living people
Sportspeople from Chocó Department
Colombian footballers
Association football midfielders
Categoría Primera A players
Segunda División players
América de Cali footballers
Independiente Santa Fe footballers
Atlético Huila footballers
Independiente Medellín footballers
Deportivo de La Coruña players
Atlético Junior footballers
Colombia under-20 international footballers
Colombian expatriate footballers
Colombian expatriate sportspeople in Spain
Expatriate footballers in Spain